In Being and Time, the philosopher Martin Heidegger made the distinction between ontical and ontological, or between beings and "being" as such. He labeled this the "Ontological Difference." It is from this distinction that he developed the concept of "Fundamental Ontology."

The history of ontology in Western philosophy is, in Heidegger's terms, ontical, whereas ontology ought to designate fundamental ontology. He says this "ontological inquiry" is required to understand the basis of the sciences.

Background

Traditional ontology asks "Why is there anything?" whereas Heidegger's "Fundamental Ontology" asks "What does it mean for something to be?," writes Taylor Carman (2003). Heidegger's "fundamental ontology" is fundamental relative to traditional ontology in that it concerns "what any understanding of entities necessarily presupposes, namely, our understanding of that in virtue of which entities are entities," Carman writes.

This "ontological difference" is central to Heidegger's philosophy. In 1937's "Contributions to Philosophy" Heidegger described it as " the essence of Dasein." 
He accuses the Western philosophical tradition of incorrectly focusing on the "ontic"—and thus forgetful of this distinction. This has led to the mistake of understanding being as such as a kind of ultimate entity, for example as idea, energeia, substantia, actualitas or will to power. According to Richard Rorty, Heidegger envisioned no "hidden power of Being" as an ultimate entity. Heidegger tries to rectify ontic philosophy by focusing instead on the meaning of being—or what he called "fundamental ontology." This "ontological inquiry" is required to understand the basis of the sciences, according to "Being and Time" (1927).

"Fundamental ontology" appeared as a result of Heidegger's decision to re-interpret phenomenology, as developed earlier by  his mentor Edmund Husserl, and which relied on a set of basic ontological categories.
Heidegger's reinterpretations placed  a new emphasis on Being (German: Sein) and included such  categories as "subject", "object", "spirit", "body", "consciousness", "reality" and others.

The project required new terminology and a redefinition of traditional concepts. For instance, the thesis that a phenomenon is the essence of a thing could not be articulated solely with traditional concepts and terms. In fact, Heidegger consistently refused to use these concepts in their Husserlian senses.

Moreover, Heidegger went on to separate his "Fundamental Ontology" from previous ontologies. Heidegger wrote that clarifying the meaning of being  is required for the basis of all fields of science. For Heidegger, the ontical forms of research conducted by scientists presuppose the fundamental-ontological. As he expresses it:

The question of Being aims… at ascertaining the a priori conditions not only for the possibility of the sciences which examine beings as beings of such and such a type, and, in doing so, already operate with an understanding of Being, but also for the possibility of those ontologies themselves which are prior to the ontical sciences and which provide their foundations. Basically, all ontology, no matter how rich and firmly compacted a system of categories it has at its disposal, remains blind and perverted from its ownmost aim, if it has not first adequately clarified the meaning of Being, and conceived this clarification as its fundamental task.

In Husserl's definition, 'phenomenon' appeared comprehensive and sufficient for his philosophical ventures. But Heidegger saw room for new development.  By shifting the priority from consciousness (psychology) to existence (ontology), Heidegger altered the subsequent direction of phenomenology.

Husserl's phenomenology includes phenomenon as "representation of the world as it is reflected in consciousness" and as the essence of a thing "as it is in itself". This differed from the traditionally accepted notion of phenomenon as "occurrence". 
Heidegger saw as insufficient the attempt of his mentor to design and save life only inside human consciousness, i.e. "the world above" of the transcendental ego.

Thus, the first task that Heidegger took on was to work out how to refute Husserl's immanence of consciousness while preserving all the achievements of his mentor's phenomenology. For Heidegger, Husserl's ideas were "in exile" with their transcendental tendency, because they were exclusively concerned with consciousness, and they had to be "thrown" back into the historical, external world.

Relationship with Dasein
Heidegger argues "Dasein is an entity which does not just occur among other entities. Rather it is ontically distinguished by the fact that, in its very Being, that Being is an issue for it". Human beings are in a privileged position to understand fundamental ontology.

See also
 Foundation ontology
 Meta-ontology

Notes

References 
 Heidegger, Martin (1997). Kant and the Problem of Metaphysics.
 Heidegger, Martin (1988). Basic Problems of Phenomenology.
 Heidegger, Martin (2010). Being and Time.

Philosophical categories
20th-century philosophy
Continental philosophy
Phenomenology